This is a list of known military aid, that has been and will be provided to Ukraine during the Russo-Ukrainian War. This list includes delivered equipment, training, intelligence, treatment of soldiers, logistical support as well as financial support to the Ukrainian government unless earmarked for humanitarian purposes. For a list of humanitarian help see: List of humanitarian aid to Ukraine during the Russo-Ukrainian War.

In total aid (military, financial and humanitarian combined), the European Union and its countries have provided the most to Ukraine, according to Kiel Institute, whereas the United States has by far provided the most in military aid.

Some NATO countries and allies, such as Germany and Sweden, have reversed past policies against providing offensive military aid in order to support Ukraine, while the European Union for the first time in its history supplied lethal arms through its institutions.



The donation of military aid was coordinated at monthly meetings in the Ukraine Defense Contact Group, throughout the war. A first meeting took place between 41 countries on 26 April 2022, and the coalition comprised 54 countries (all 30 member states of NATO and 24 other countries) at the latest meeting on 14 February 2023. All EU member states donated military aid both  individually as sovereign countries and collectively via EU institutions, except of three countries (Hungary, Cyprus and Malta) that opted not to donate military aid individually as sovereign countries.

Donors
As of February 2023, military aid was donated by EU institutions, 45 sovereign countries, companies, and other parties.

Sovereign countries

European Union 

Individual EU member states have provided military, financial, and non-lethal material aid since 2014. The following list is the aid collectively provided by the EU. Most of this aid has been coordinated by the European Commission.
 Around €17 billion in grants and loans from 2014 until 12 February 2022.
 €1.2 billion loan approved 16 February 2022
 €450 million worth of lethal weapons, announced on 27 February 2022, under the European Peace Facility.
 €50 million worth of non-lethal aid, announced on 27 February 2022.
 Provision of satellite intelligence, notably through the European Union Satellite Centre, as part of 1 March 2022 resolution on the Russian aggression against Ukraine.
 Increase of military aid under the European Peace Facility to €1 billion, announced on 23 March 2022.
 Military aid increased to €1.5 billion under the European Peace Facility on 13 April 2022, assistance includes personal protective equipment, first aid kits and fuel, as well as military equipment.
 Protective gear worth over €977,000 donated to the State Border Guard Service of Ukraine on 8 July 2022.
 An additional €500 million military aid package for Ukraine approved by the EU on 18 July 2022.
 Around €500,000 worth of thermal imaging equipment provided by the EU for the State Border Guard Service of Ukraine.

Unknown countries 
 TAB-71M APCs [Delivered by Romania, Croatia or Moldova]
 Titan-s APCs (produced in the United Arab Emirates)
 Panthera T-6 APCs (produced in the United Arab Emirates)
 100 BATT UMG APCs [delivered by unknown Eastern European country]
 GAIA Amir MRAPs (produced in Israel)
 Zastava M55 and M75 anti-aircraft guns [delivered by Croatia or Slovenia]
 M69A 82mm mortars (produced by Bosnian company).

Iranian-smuggled weapons 
The following list attempts to provide an overview of Iranian-made or Iranian-smuggled weapons in use by the Ukrainian armed forces. They are believed to be intercepted armaments originally intended for Yemen. The year shown in the brackets indicates the first sighting of the weapons in Ukraine, not their date of delivery. This list will be updated as additional types of weapons are uncovered.

Heavy mortars
 120mm HM-16 (July 2022).

Light mortars
 82mm HM-19 (May 2022).

Small arms
 Type 56-1 assault rifle (April 2022).

Ammunition
 122mm OF-462 artillery rounds for D-30 howitzer (September 2022).
 122mm HE-FRAG Rockets For BM-21 'Grad' MRL.
 152mm Artillery Rounds For D-20 Howitzer.
 125mm OF19 Tank Rounds (February 2023).
 120mm M48 Mortar Rounds For HM-16 Mortar (March 2023).

Companies 

More than 100 companies have taken actions in support of Ukraine, including boycotts, in February and March 2022.

Other parties 
 Citizens of Taiwan donated $945 million NTD (US$33 million) as of 2 April 2022.
 $6,000 worth of AR-15 rifle parts donated by Taiwanese citizens.
 Citizens of South Korea have so far donated $3 million directly to the Ukrainian Embassy in Seoul.
 South Korean "military geeks" or "밀덕" (mildeok) have been donating their military materiel directly to the Ukrainian Embassy in Seoul including: bulletproof helmets, bulletproof vests, military blankets, hemostatic tourniquets, ammunition pouches, first aid kits, knee and elbow guards, etc.
 According to President Zelenskyy, 16,000 foreigners have volunteered to join an International Brigade in response to Ukraine's call for foreign fighters as of 3 March 2022.
 In addition to private donations, numerous American states and local law enforcement agencies are donating surplus protective equipment through the Ukrainian American Coordinating Council and other organizations.
 "Blue/Yellow" charity in Lithuania, dedicated for supporting Ukraine, collected over €22.9 million (as of 30 March) from the citizens of Lithuania.
 On 30 May 2022 Lithuanian citizens raised €5 million for the crowdfunded purchase of a Bayraktar TB2 armed UAV for the Ukrainian military, the drone was subsequently, given to Lithuania by Baykar Tech free of charge, with the €6 million collected used for aid. It reached Ukraine on July 8, 2022.
 Lithuanian civilians also crowdfunded 7 Estonian made EOS C VTOl reconnaissance drones (two of which were crowdfunded in early May, with the other five being later purchased with the money collected from the TB2 crowdfunder), 110 Lithuanian-made EDM4S Sky Wiper anti drone weapons, 37 WB Electronics Warmates (including launch/control equipment and ammunition), and 18 UJ-23 Topazs for the Ukrainian military.
 Citizens of the Czech Republic donated over CZK 4,25 billion ($171 million) as of 24 June 2022.
 1 Bivoj system (3 reconnaissance/attack UAVs + mobile command center) was crowdfunded by Czech Republic citizens and delivered in July 2022.
 15 MR2s Viktor (a Toyota Land Cruiser 70 with a 14.5mm ZU-2 cannon) crowfunded by Czech citizens (set to be delivered in February 2023).
 1 T-72 Avenger (T-72 upgraded to 3rd gen tank) crowdfunded by citizens in Czech Republic and delivered in October 2022.
 By the 24th July 2022, a Polish crowdfunding campaign on the crowdfunding website Zrzutka raised over Zł 23,035,000 to purchase a Baykar Bayraktar TB2 for the Ukrainian military, the drone was subsequently given to Poland by Baykar Tech free of charge, with the €5 million collected used for aid.
 Revolver 860 Armed VTOL unmanned aerial vehicle [March, April or May 2022] (A few sold to Polish company. Subsequently transferred to Ukraine).

Russian response 

Russia has sent a diplomatic letter to the United States warning it not to supply Ukraine with any more weapons and that the United States and NATO aid of the "most sensitive" weapons to Ukraine were "adding fuel" and could bring "unpredictable consequences."

Olga Skabeyeva said on state-owned Rossiya 1 TV: "It can safely be called World War Three. That's entirely for sure. [...] We're definitely fighting against NATO infrastructure, if not NATO itself. We need to recognise that." She has further claimed that NATO is supplying Ukraine with "zillions of weapons".

Russia banned members of the UK cabinet including then prime minister Boris Johnson and former PM Theresa May from visiting the country: "In essence, the British leadership is deliberately aggravating the situation around Ukraine, pumping the Kyiv regime with lethal weapons and coordinating similar efforts on the part of NATO."

Russian aircraft have flown over the Baltic and Black Seas without flight plans or transponders or communicating with civilians or military air traffic controllers, and in some cases they have closely approached or slightly violated the airspace of other nations. NATO aircraft from Poland, Denmark, France, Italy, Spain, Romania and the United Kingdom, along with aircraft from non-NATO Sweden and Finland, have intercepted these Russian planes.

Other responses 
South Korea has initially declined to send any lethal aid such as the KM-SAM missile system citing its security situation. It has since supplied Ukraine with Chiron MANPADS by routing through Czech Republic.

Taiwan has kept mainly to humanitarian and financial aid.

South Africa has maintained a neutral stance.

Military aid planning 
In late March 2022, Ukrainian President Volodymyr Zelensky requested "1 percent" of NATO's planes and tanks. Ukraine's requirements moved from defensive weapons which are hand-held such as NLAW, Stinger, Starstreak, Javelin and drones to heavier weapons such as artillery, tanks, and aircraft. Ukraine had been relying on Eastern European NATO members' old stockpiles of Soviet equipment, but the number of manufacturers of Soviet equipment in Eastern Europe is limited.

Following pleas from Zelensky for countries to send heavier weapons and air defenses to aid in battling Russia, a first meeting was held by the Ukraine Defense Contact Group (also known as "Ukraine Defense Consultative Group") on 26 April 2022 at Ramstein Air Base in Germany. Participants at the meeting were defense ministers and chiefs of staff from 41 countries willing to provide military aid to Ukraine. The meeting was led by United States Secretary of Defense Lloyd J. Austin III. They were joined by Ukrainian Minister of Defense Oleksii Reznikov. The meeting discussed "a steady flow of weapons and other military aid" to Ukraine.

The coalition planned to continue meeting as a monthly "contact group" to address long-term support for Ukraine. In addition to European Union NATO countries, Ukraine, and the U.S., the coalition includes: Sweden, Finland, United Kingdom, Canada, Australia, New Zealand, South Korea, Japan, Morocco, Kenya, Liberia, Tunisia, Jordan, and Israel. Their purpose is to work out ongoing aid to Ukraine, with an emphasis on providing "lethal aid" to help with the ongoing war. Austin said, "I'd like this whole group to leave today with a common, transparent understanding of Ukraine's near-term security requirements—because we're going to keep on moving heaven and earth to meet them." According to Pentagon Press Secretary John F. Kirby: "A new phase, …I think [Austin] also wants to take a longer, larger view of the defense relationships that Ukraine will need to have going forward, when the war is over." Kirby also said, "I don't think anybody can predict how long this is going to go on…  The truth is… if Mr. Putin pulled his forces out and stopped this illegal invasion, and sat down in good faith with Mr. Zelensky, [the conflict] could be over now."

Russian comments about a desire to move onto Moldova, after occupying the Southern Ukraine coast and the Donbas, also threatens to expand the scope of the conflict. Although Putin and Russian Foreign Minister Sergey Lavrov have characterized the conflict as a proxy war instigated by NATO, the U.S.-led Ukraine Defense Consultative Group reflects a broader coalition of countries.

On 28 April 2022, US President Joe Biden asked Congress for an additional $33 billion to assist Ukraine, including $20 billion to provide weapons to Ukraine. On 21 May 2022, the United States passed legislation providing $40 billion in new military and humanitarian foreign aid to Ukraine, marking a historically large commitment of funds.

When the Ukraine Defense Contact Group held its latest ninth meeting on 14 February 2023, its list of members had grown from the initial 41 countries, to a new total of 54 countries.

See also 

 Ukraine Democracy Defense Lend-Lease Act of 2022
 Corporate responses to the 2022 Russian invasion of Ukraine

Invasion 
 Prelude to the 2022 Russian invasion of Ukraine
 2022 Russian invasion of Ukraine
 Timeline of the 2022 Russian invasion of Ukraine

Reactions 
 Government and intergovernmental reactions to the 2022 Russian invasion of Ukraine
 Potential enlargement of NATO
 Potential enlargement of the European Union
 Protests against the 2022 Russian invasion of Ukraine
 Reactions to the 2021–2022 Russo-Ukrainian crisis
 Reactions to the 2022 Russian invasion of Ukraine

Sanctions, boycotts, censorship and cyberwarfare 
 2022 boycott of Russia and Belarus
 International sanctions during the Russo-Ukrainian War
 List of companies that applied sanctions during the Russo-Ukrainian War
 Russian–Ukrainian cyberwarfare

Humanitarian crisis 
 2022 Ukrainian refugee crisis
 Casualties of the Russo-Ukrainian War
 War crimes in the 2022 Russian invasion of Ukraine

Equipment 
 List of Russo-Ukrainian conflict military equipment

Notes

References

External links
 "Ukraine Support Tracker - A Database of Military, Financial and Humanitarian Aid to Ukraine" by the Kiel Institute for the World Economy
 James Rushton, "What Heavy Weapons the West Has (and Hasn't) Sent Ukraine," Newlines Institute.
 Arms Transfers to Ukraine

Ukraine
Foreign relations of Ukraine
Military economics
Reactions to the 2022 Russian invasion of Ukraine
Military equipment of Ukraine
Ukrainian military-related lists